The Big Challenge is an album by trumpeter Cootie Williams and cornetist Rex Stewart, recorded in 1957 and released on the Jazztone label.

Reception

Scott Yanow of AllMusic states, "a fun and unusual Jazztone session. Six distinctive and very different veterans were teamed together ... the unique matchups are very successful. Each of the musicians has an opportunity to be featured and the tradeoffs are quite memorable. A colorful gem.".

Track listing
 "I'm Beginning to See the Light" (Duke Ellington, Don George, Johnny Hodges, Harry James) – 6:06
 "Do Nothing Till You Hear from Me" (Ellington, Bob Russell) – 4:07
 "Alphonse and Gaston" (Ernie Wilkins) – 8:29
 "I Got a Right to Sing the Blues" (Harold Arlen, Ted Koehler) – 4:09
 "Walkin' My Baby Back Home" (Fred E. Ahlert, Roy Turk) – 4:42
 "When Your Lover Has Gone" (Einar Aaron Swan) – 5:08	
 "I Knew You When" (Rex Stewart) – 4:42
Recorded at Webster Hall in NYC on April 30 (tracks 1-3) and May 6 (tracks 4-7), 1957

Personnel
Cootie Williams – trumpet
Rex Stewart – cornet
Lawrence Brown, J. C. Higginbotham – trombone
Bud Freeman, Coleman Hawkins – tenor saxophone
Billy Bauer – guitar
Hank Jones – piano
Milt Hinton – double bass
Gus Johnson – drums
Ernie Wilkins – arranger

References

Rex Stewart albums
Cootie Williams albums
1957 albums
Albums arranged by Ernie Wilkins